Stop the Presses may refer to:

 Stop the presses, or stop press, an idiomatic exclamation when significant information is discovered
 "Stop the Presses (BoJack Horseman)", an episode of the animated television series BoJack Horseman
 "Stop the Presses", an episode of The Incredible Hulk
Stop the Presses, a 2008 film by Mark Birnbaum
Stop the Press, an episode of Shining Time Station